Cherokee County Schools is a public school district in Cherokee County, Alabama, United States, based in Centre, Alabama. It serves the communities of Centre, Cedar Bluff, Gaylesville, Leesburg, Sand Rock, Spring Garden, and Broomtown.

Schools
The Cherokee County School District operates eight schools, including four schools that incorporate kindergarten through grade 12 in one building located in the respective namesake towns. The school system located in Centre has a distinct elementary, middle, and high school.  The district also has a vocational school where grades 7-12 can learn about career technologies.

Board of Education 
The Cherokee County Board of Education has five members, elected to six year terms. Members of the Board may not be employees of the Board. The current members of the Board of Education are Superintendent Mike Welsh. Board members consist of Randall Davis, Corey Colbert, Lisa Chandler, Lisa McKissick, and Kathy Mobbs.

K-12 schools
Cedar Bluff School
Gaylesville School
Sand Rock School
Spring Garden School

Elementary schools
Centre Elementary School

Middle schools
Centre Middle School

High schools
Cherokee County High School

System Programs
Cherokee County Career & Technology Center

References

External links

School districts in Alabama
Education in Cherokee County, Alabama